John Milton Bright (January 1, 1908 – September 14, 1989) was an American journalist, screenwriter and political activist.

Bright was born in Baltimore and worked with Ben Hecht as a newspaper journalist in Chicago.  With fellow journalist Kubec Glasmon, Bright co-wrote a series of stories adapted as screenplays.  The most notable of these, Beer and Blood, became the 1931 film The Public Enemy starring James Cagney.  The two were nominated for a 1931 Academy Award for Best Story.

In 1933 he became one of the ten founders of the Screen Writers Guild.  As with other founders and members of the Screen Writers Guild, Bright was targeted in the early 1950s by the House Un-American Activities Committee, and put on the Hollywood blacklist.

Bright's wife Josefina Fierro was a Mexican-American activist in her own right.  Bright fled to Mexico and wrote screenplays for at least two Mexican films.

His posthumous 2002 memoir was called Worms in the Winecup.

Films 

Bright's credits as a screenwriter, often collaborating with others, include:

 Smart Money (1931)
 The Public Enemy (1931)
 Blonde Crazy (1931)
 The Crowd Roars (1932)
 Three on a Match (1932)
Taxi! (1932)
 If I Had a Million (1932)
 She Done Him Wrong (1933)
 San Quentin (1937)
 Sherlock Holmes and the Voice of Terror (1942)
 The Brave Bulls (1951)

References

External links
Interview of John Bright, part of Hollywood Blacklist interview series, Center for Oral History Research, UCLA Library Special Collections, University of California, Los Angeles.

1908 births
1989 deaths
20th-century American male writers
20th-century American screenwriters
American activists
American male journalists
American male screenwriters
Hollywood blacklist
Writers from Baltimore
Writers from Chicago